Qu Yuan ( – 278 BC) was a Chinese poet and politician in the State of Chu during the Warring States period. He is known for his patriotism and contributions to classical poetry and verses, especially through the poems of the Chu Ci anthology (also known as The Songs of the South or Songs of Chu): a volume of poems attributed to or considered to be inspired by his verse writing. Together with the Shi Jing, the Chu Ci is one of the two greatest collections of ancient Chinese verse. He is also remembered in connection to the supposed origin of the Dragon Boat Festival.

Historical details about Qu Yuan's life are few, and his authorship of many Chu Ci poems has been questioned at length. However, he is widely accepted to have written "The Lament," a Chu Ci poem. The first known reference to Qu Yuan appears in a poem written in 174 BC by Jia Yi, an official from Luoyang who was slandered by jealous officials and banished to Changsha by Emperor Wen of Han. While traveling, he wrote a poem describing the similar fate of a previous "Qu Yuan." Eighty years later, the first known biography of Qu Yuan's life appeared in Han dynasty historian Sima Qian's Records of the Grand Historian, though it contains a number of contradictory details.

Life
The only surviving source of information on Qu Yuan's life is Sima Qian's biography of him in Records of the Grand Historian (Shiji), although the biography is circumstantial and probably influenced greatly by Sima's own identification with Qu. Sima wrote that Qu was a member of the Chu royal clan and served as an official under King Huai of Chu (reigned 328–299 BC).

During the early days of King Huai's reign, Qu Yuan was serving the State of Chu as its Left Minister. However, King Huai exiled Qu Yuan to the region north of the Han River, because corrupt ministers slandered him and influenced the king. Eventually, Qu Yuan was reinstated and sent on a diplomatic mission to the State of Qi. He tried to resume relations between Chu and Qi, which King Huai had broken under the false pretense of King Hui of Qin to cede territory near Shangyu.

During King Qingxiang's reign, Prime Minister Zilan slandered Qu Yuan. This caused Qu Yuan's exile to the regions south of the Yangtze River. It is said that Qu Yuan returned first to his home town. In his exile, he spent much of this time collecting legends and rearranging folk odes while traveling the countryside. Furthermore, he wrote some of the greatest poetry in Chinese literature and expressed deep concerns about his state. According to legend, his anxiety brought him to an increasingly troubled state of health. During his depression, he would often take walks near a certain well to look upon his thin and gaunt reflection in the water. This well became known as the "Face Reflection Well." On a hillside in Xiangluping (at present-day Zigui County, Hubei Province), there is a well that is considered to be the original well from the time of Qu Yuan.

In 278 BC, learning of the capture of his country's capital, Ying, by General Bai Qi of the state of Qin, Qu Yuan is said to have collected folktales and written the lengthy poem of lamentation called "Lament for Ying". Eventually, he committed suicide by wading into the Miluo River in today's Hunan Province while holding a rock. The reason why he took his life remained controversial and was argued by Chinese scholars for centuries. Typical explanations including martyrdom for his deeply beloved but falling motherland, which was suggested by the philosopher Zhu Xi of Song Dynasty, or feeling extreme despair to the situation of the politics in Chu while his lifelong political dream would never be realized. But according to "Yu Fu," widely considered to be written by Qu himself or at least, a person who was very familiar with Qu, his suicide was an ultimate way to protect his innocence and life principles.

Qu Yuan is said to have expressed his love for the ruling monarch, King Huai of Chu, through several of this works, including "The Lament" and "Longing for Beauty".

Legacy

Qu Yuan is regarded as the first author of verse in China to have his name associated to his work, since prior to that time, poetic works were not attributed to any specific authors. He is considered to have initiated the so-called sao style of verse, which is named after his work "Li Sao," in which he abandoned the classic four-character verses used in poems of Shi Jing and adopted verses with varying lengths. This resulted in poems with more rhythm and latitude in expression. Qu Yuan is also regarded as one of the most prominent figures of Romanticism in Chinese classical literature, and his masterpieces influenced some of the great Romanticist poets in Tang Dynasty. During the Han Dynasty, Qu Yuan became established as a heroic example of how a scholar and official who was denied public recognition suitable to their worth should behave.

Chu Ci

Chu was located in what is now the Yangzi River area of central China. At this time, Chu represented the southern fringe of the Chinese cultural area, having for a time been part of both the Shang dynasty and the Zhou dynasty empires. However, the Chu culture also retained certain characteristics of local traditions such as shamanism, the influence of which can be seen in the Chu Ci.

The Chu Ci was compiled and annotated by Wang Yi (died AD 158), which is the source of transmission of these poems and any reliable information about them to subsequent times; thus, the role which Qu Yuan had in the authoring, editing, or retouching of these works remains unclear. The Chu Ci poems are important as being direct precursors of the fu style of Han Dynasty literature. The Chu Ci, as a preservation of early literature, has provided invaluable data for linguistic research into the history of the Chinese language, from Chen Di on.

Religion
Following his suicide, Qu Yuan was sometimes revered as a water god, including by Taiwanese Taoists, who number him among the Kings of the Water Immortals.

Patriotism

Qu Yuan began to be treated in a nationalist way as "China's first patriotic poet" during World War II. Wen Yiduo—a socialist poet and scholar later executed by the KMT—wrote in his Mythology & Poetry that, "although Qu Yuan did not write about the life of the people or voice their sufferings, he may truthfully be said to have acted as the leader of a people's revolution and to have struck a blow to avenge them. Qu Yuan is the only person in the whole of Chinese history who is fully entitled to be called 'the people's poet'." Guo Moruo's 1942 play Qu Yuan gave him similar treatment, drawing parallels to Hamlet and King Lear. Their view of Qu's social idealism and unbending patriotism became canonical under the People's Republic of China after the 1949 Communist victory in the Chinese Civil War. For example, one high-school Chinese textbook from 1957 began with the sentence "Qu Yuan was the first great patriotic poet in the history of our country's literature". This cult status increased Qu Yuan's position within China's literary canon, seeing him placed on postage stamps and the Dragon Boat Festival elevated to a national public holiday in 2008. It has, however, come at the expense of more the critical scholarly appraisals of Qu Yuan's historicity and alleged body of work that had developed during the late Qing and early Republic.

Dragon Boat Festival

Popular legend has it that villagers carried their dumplings and boats to the middle of the river and desperately tried to save Qu Yuan after he immersed himself in the Miluo but were too late to do so. However, in order to keep fish and evil spirits away from his body, they beat drums and splashed the water with their paddles, and they also threw rice into the water both as a food offering to Qu Yuan's spirit and also to distract the fish away from his body. However, the legend continues, that late one night, the spirit of Qu Yuan appeared before his friends and told them that he died because he had taken himself under the river. Then, he asked his friends to wrap their rice into three-cornered silk packages to ward off the dragon.

These packages became a traditional food known as zongzi, although the lumps of rice are now wrapped in leaves instead of silk. The act of racing to search for his body in boats gradually became the cultural tradition of dragon boat racing, held on the anniversary of his death every year. Today, people still eat zongzi and participate in dragon boat races to commemorate Qu Yuan's sacrifice on the fifth day of the fifth month of the traditional lunisolar Chinese calendar. The countries around China, such as Vietnam and Korea, also celebrate variations of this Dragon Boat Festival as part of their shared cultural heritage.

Space Exploration
China's interplanetary exploration program, Tianwen (Heavenly Questions) is named after a poem by Qu Yuan. The first mission to Mars, Tianwen-1, was launched on July 23, 2020, and reached Mars on February 10, 2021. On Mar 14, 2021, the lander and rover successfully landed on the surface of Mars.

See also

Jiu Ge
Classical Chinese poetry
Tianwen
Song Yu
Dragon Boat Festival
Tianwen-1
Qu (surname 屈)
Shun Li and the Poet (Qu Yuan serves as Shun Li's inspiration)

References

Citations

Bibliography

 
 .
 . 
 
 .
 .
 .
 
 
 . 
 .
 .

Further reading

External links

"Qu Yuan (Chu Yuan), the great poet"
"This article has photos of Qu Yuan's hometown before it was submerged by the dams project"
"The Dragon Boat Festival" (article reproduced from Volume 1, number 2 of the newsletter of Families with Children from China of the San Francisco Bay Area)

340s BC births
278 BC deaths
4th-century BC Chinese poets
3rd-century BC Chinese poets
Chinese gods
Chu state people
Deified Chinese people
Suicides by drowning in China
Zhou dynasty musicians
Zhou dynasty poets
Zhou dynasty politicians
Guqin players
Water gods
Ancient people who committed suicide
Suicides in China